Francis George Ferrier Bowey (16 December 1881 – 4 July 1947) was an Australian rules footballer who played with Geelong in the Victorian Football League (VFL).

Notes

External links 

1881 births
1947 deaths
Australian rules footballers from Victoria (Australia)
Geelong Football Club players